Sangue do Meu Sangue is a Brazilian telenovela produced by the SBT, shown from 11 of July 1995 to 4 of May 1996, originally by Vicente Sesso, adapted by Paulo Figueiredo and Rita Buzzar (substituted for the  Vicente Sesso), and directed by Nilton Travesso, Enrique Martins, Antonino Seabra and Del Rangel. General direction of Nilton Travesso.

Story
The story is set in nineteenth-century Brazil, in the time of the Second Empire. To prevent the embezzlement that had given the banker's father was discovered, Clovis causes a bombing incident to injure Carlos Camargo, an official who could incriminate him. Carlos survives, but loses his memory and can not remember his beloved Helena and his children, named Lucio, Cynthia, and Ricardo.

Ten years pass. Wandering the streets, Carlos joins the troupe of gypsies Raposo, who welcome him, and he reclaims his memory. He then proceeds to live day-to-day life without his family.  He continues living and struggling to pay Clovis for all the evils he committed. Besides embezzlement and attempted murder, he oppresses his wife, Julia, tries to convince everyone that she is crazy and mistreats slaves, among other atrocities. Amid the plot is the actress Pola Renon, who was the lover of Charles and his supposed death began to help his family, without revealing anything about the novel. The eldest son of Carlos, Lucio, falls in love with Pola. Their lives and dramas are bolstered by the machinations of the abolition of slavery. There is a fight featuring Julia as an ally when she decides to break free from the clutches of an oppressive husband who she does not love.

Cast

1995 telenovelas
Brazilian telenovelas
1995 Brazilian television series debuts
1996 Brazilian television series endings
Sistema Brasileiro de Televisão telenovelas
Portuguese-language telenovelas